Aline Mackinnon (30 October 1899 – 1 January 1970) was a British radical feminist, Liberal Party politician and civil servant.

Early life and education
Mackinnon was born in Hadley Wood, Middlesex, the third of four daughters born to Sir Percy Graham MacKinnon and Mabel Lockett. She was educated at Newnham College, Cambridge and the University of Edinburgh, where she graduated with a Master of Arts.

Political career
In 1921 she attended the first Liberal Summer School. She was the Honorary Parliamentary Secretary to the Women's Liberal Federation. She was selected as Liberal candidate for Holderness and came second;

She was Honorary Secretary of the Liberal Summer School. She fought Holderness again in 1935, slightly reducing the Conservative majority;

She was given another opportunity to enter Parliament at the Holderness by-election on 15 February 1939. Despite the presence of a Labour candidate, she had some public support from prominent Labour people who supported the notion of a Popular Front. She had offered to withdraw if the Labour candidate withdrew in favour of an Independent Progressive candidate acceptable to both parties.

Deprived by the outbreak of war of another attempt to be elected at Holderness, she retired from elective politics but continued to be active in the national party as a member of the Liberal Party Council, and for the Women's Liberal Federation, serving as Vice-President. She was a civil servant from 1941 to 1947. Her Women's Liberal colleague Frances Josephy described her as "very knowledgeable and a brilliant speaker with a pretty wit".

A keen skier and mountaineer, she died while on vacation in Austria, aged 70.

References

External links
Portrait at the National Portrait Gallery

1899 births
1970 deaths
People from Hadley Wood
Alumni of Newnham College, Cambridge
Alumni of the University of Edinburgh
Liberal Party (UK) parliamentary candidates